The New Zealand TEA Party (Taxpayers and Entrepreneurs Alliance) is an unregistered political party in New Zealand. The party is led by John Hong. The party contested the 2020 general election, but did not win any seats.

Policies 
The party defines itself as anti-racist, socially democratic, and fiscally conservative. It supports reform of the Family Court of New Zealand. Party policies include support for business, opposition to capital gains taxes, embracing migration and multiculturalism, and opposition to legalisation of recreational cannabis consumption.

It has no connection to the American Tea Party movement.

History

Foundation 
The party was founded by two former Auckland mayoral candidates, John Hong and Susanna Kruger, and it includes a third; John Palino, who ran his electorate campaign from Florida, where he is currently living during the COVID-19 pandemic. At its creation, the party was co-led by Hong and Kruger. The party's website describes Roger Douglas as its patron.

2020 general election 
The party did not apply for a broadcasting allocation for the 2020 general election. In July 2020, the TEA Party applied to the Electoral Commission to be a registered party and it was registered on 6 August 2020. In September 2020, the TEA Party announced their candidate list for the 2020 election. Youth wing president, Dominic Hoffman Dervan was also a TEA Party list candidate and stood for the Auckland Central electorate contesting in the 2020 general election.

The party received 2,415 of the party vote, or 0.1%, in the 2020 election, and won no electorate seats, so did not enter Parliament.

Present status 
The current party leader is John Hong, and its president is Brett Killip.

The party's registration was cancelled at its request on 14 September 2022.

References

2020 establishments in New Zealand
Political parties established in 2020